
King County is a county in Washington State that includes the city of Seattle.

King County may also refer to:

Places
 King County, Texas, United States
 King County, New South Wales, Australia

Ship
 King County (steam ferry), which operated on Lake Washington, Washington, United States, from 1900 to 1907 or 1908